The Brazelton House is a historic house located at 401 North Main Street in Mount Pleasant, Iowa.

Description and history 
William P. Brazelton was an early leader in the city's development, owning the Brazelton Banking House and the Brazelton House Hotel. His house, built in 1858, is the earliest substantial residence built here, and it is a significant contribution to its domestic architecture. The main form for this two-story brick structure is the Italianate style, however it combines other styles into its design and ornamentation. Moorish elements are found in the front porch,
especially in the arches. Romanesque influence is found in the windows of the tower, the two-story turreted bay, and the single-story bay. Under the eaves are found smaller single brackets in between sets large double brackets.

The house was listed on the National Register of Historic Places on January 27, 1983.

The house was most recently sold for $114,000 in November 2011.

References

Houses completed in 1858
Italianate architecture in Iowa
Houses in Mount Pleasant, Iowa
Houses on the National Register of Historic Places in Iowa
National Register of Historic Places in Henry County, Iowa